The women's long jump at the 2014 European Athletics Championships took place at the Letzigrund on 12 and 13 August.

Medalists

Records

Schedule

Results

Qualification

6.65 m (Q) or at least 12 best performers (q) advance to the Final.

Final

References

Long Jump W
Long jump at the European Athletics Championships
2014 in women's athletics